John Fendall Jr. (9 October 1762 – 10 November 1825) was a colonial official in the British East India Company and governor of Java for five months in 1816 before it was returned to the Netherlands.

Early life and service in East India Company
Fendall was born on 9 October 1762 in St Andrew Holburn, London. He began service in the East India Company in 1778 at the age of 16. In 1790 he was Collector of Midnapur and had attained the status of Senior Merchant. He returned to London in 1809 for the first time in 31 years.  The voyage at that time took 5 ½ months to complete.

Governor of Java
Fendall returned to Calcutta in 1815 only to find that he had been appointed Lieutenant-Governor of Java, an island the British took from the Dutch in 1811. On 12 March 1816 by the last advice from Batavia, John relieved Sir Stamford Raffles as Lieutenant-Governor of Java, an island which is now a part of the Republic of Indonesia.

In 1816, the Dutch sent a fleet to reclaim possession of Java. However, Fendall had not received orders from the Governor-General, and therefore, stoutly refused to give up possession, and the Dutch had to wait until the orders came. On 19 August, of the same year, the Dutch resumed possession, thus making Fendall the last British Lieutenant-Governor. Fendall left Java in June 1818, on the ship Caesar.

Fendall returned to Calcutta in 1817 and took his seat on the Bench of Sudder Diwani and Nizamat Adalat, the predecessor of the High Court. It seems that while at Java, Fendall had disallowed some allowance which a certain Col. Yule had claimed. As a result, the fiery soldier followed him to Calcutta and demanded that he should alter his decision. After Fendall refused, Yule pushed the papers in his face and brushed them across it and told him to take it as a personal insult. This Fendall was quite ready to do and sent for a friend, named Assey, to take a challenge to the Colonel. Assey refused to have anything to do with a challenge, in spite of John’s protests, and took the matter to various members of Council. The Council agreed that Fendall could not be called on to defend an official act in such a way and that Col. Yule’s conduct was highly insubordinate. As the Governor-General agreed with them, Fendall was forbidden to fight and his opponent apologized, to escape being tried by court martial.

Fendall was transferred to Bengal, and became a member of the Supreme Council on 20 May 1820, which constituted membership in the Bengal Civil Service. He was a Senior Merchant of the East India Company, and in 1823 was the President of the Board of Trade on the Bengal Establishment. In 1824 he served on the Viceroy's Executive Council. Fendall died on 10 November 1825 in Calcutta iand was buried at South Park Street Cemetery.

Personal life
John married first in 1790, Mary Farquharson (1761–1818), the daughter of John Farquharson of "Yateley", Hampshire, England, a scion of the family of Farquharson of Fingean. They had six children, Mary Fendall (later Mary D'Oyly) (1794–1885), Harriet Fendall (later Harriet Thompson) (1797–1842), Harriet Fendall (later Harriet Moultrie) (1797–1867), Louisa Fendall (1799–1899), James Fendall (1801–1866) and Sophia Fendall (1805–1808).

John married second, Harriet "Henrietta" Halcott (died 1871) in 1820. They had one son, Thomas Halcott Fendall (1825–1865).

John had two residences. One was at Harewood Square, St. Marylebone, London, England. The other was 67 Great Portland St., St. Marylebone, London, England, a house that had belonged to his grandfather.

Ancestry
John was the son of John Fendall Sr., Esq. (1729–1791) and Sarah Bolde (1735–1813). John Sr., was in turn the son of William Fendall Sr. (1693–1753) and Delarivers Pauncefoot (nee Barnes), daughter of John Barnes of Hall Court, Much Marcle, Herefordshire. William Sr., was the son of Thomas Fendall Sr., and his wife, Jane (1648–1736), of Gloucester, England. Sarah Bolde was the daughter of Edward Bolde (1688-1755) and Mary Cole (1699-1759). William Fendall Sr, was Delarivers second husband. She was previously married to John Pauncefoot (also spelt Pauncefote) (1692-1722). Delarivers had 5 children with John and 3 children with William.

References

British East India Company civil servants
British rule in Indonesia
1825 deaths
1762 births